Branching Out is an album by jazz cornetist Nat Adderley released on the Riverside label featuring performances by Adderley with Johnny Griffin, and The Three Sounds.

Reception
The Allmusic review by Scott Yanow states: "Adderley and Griffin made for an exciting frontline". The Penguin Guide to Jazz states: "Branching Out is an attractive enough set, but Griff doesn't seem the right saxophone-player for the gig, too noisy and rapid-fire".

Track listing
All compositions by Nat Adderley except as indicated

 "Sister Caroline" - 5:51
 "Well, You Needn't" (Thelonious Monk) - 8:26
 "Don't Get Around Much Anymore" (Duke Ellington, Bob Russell) - 4:36
 "I Got Plenty O' Nuttin'" (George Gershwin, Ira Gershwin, DuBose Heyward) - 5:02
 "Branching Out" (Harold Mabern) - 6:50
 "I Never Knew I Could Love Anybody (Like I'm Loving You)" (Raymond B. Egan, Roy Marsh, Thomas Pitts) - 4:44
 "Warm Blue Stream" (Sara Cassey, Dotty Wayne) - 4:23

Personnel
Nat Adderley – cornet 
Johnny Griffin - tenor saxophone
Gene Harris - piano
Andy Simpkins - bass
Bill Dowdy - drums

References

1958 albums
Riverside Records albums
Nat Adderley albums